Tōbaé (トバエ) was a Japanese and French weekly satirical magazine published in the period 1887–1889.

History and profile
Tōbaé was started by French cartoonist Georges Ferdinand Bigot in 1887 as a weekly satirical magazine. The magazine featured Bigot's cartoons which were mostly dealt with everyday activities of Japanese people and Japanese politicians. The cartoons criticized the negative consequences of the westernization attempts in Japan. Tōbaé folded in 1889.

References

External links

1887 establishments in Japan
1889 disestablishments in Japan
Defunct magazines published in Japan
French-language magazines
French political satire
Magazines established in 1887
Magazines disestablished in 1889
Magazines published in Tokyo
Satirical magazines
Weekly magazines published in Japan